The Payne Baronetcy, of St Christopher's in the West Indies, was a title in the Baronetage of Great Britain. It was created on 31 October 1737 for Charles Payne. According to some sources that title became extinct on the death of the second Baronet, Sir Gillis Payne, in 1801. Sir Gillis was in a relationship with a farmer's daughter, Maria Keeling. They apparently married in 1761 although several children had been born before this date. Peter Payne was the eldest son born after the marriage and would normally have succeeded in the title. However, he allowed his eldest brother John Payne to assume the title, although John was illegitimate. John died in 1803 when his son Charles assumed the title. However, in 1828 Peter Payne raised the question in the courts over who was the rightful baronet. The Court of Chancery declared that he was the rightful heir to his father, but this was overturned by the Lord Chancellor in 1829. Nonetheless, during his lifetime Sir Peter was universally acknowledged as a baronet. Most reference books on the British nobility and baronetage include the title, although they describe it as being in dispute between rival branches of the family. Charles Robert Salusbury Payne, the supposed sixth Baronet, appears to have discontinued the claim around 1900.

Sir Peter Payne, who claimed to be the third Baronet, sat as Member of Parliament for Bedfordshire between 1831 and 1832. Abraham Payne, brother of the first Baronet, was the grandfather of Sir William Payne-Gallwey, 1st Baronet (see Frankland-Payne-Gallwey baronets) and of Ralph Payne, 1st Baron Lavington.

Payne baronets, of St Christopher's (1737)
Sir Charles Payne, 1st Baronet (died 1738)
Sir Gillies Payne, 2nd Baronet (1720–1801) - possibly the title became extinct on his death
Sir Peter Payne, 3rd Baronet (1762–1843)
Sir Charles Gillies Payne, 4th Baronet (1793–1870)
Sir Salusbury Gillies Payne, 5th Baronet (1829–1893)
Charles Robert Salusbury Payne, presumed 6th Baronet (1859–1942) - appears to have discontinued claim to title circa 1900
or
Sir John Payne, de facto 3rd Baronet (died 1803) - succeeded his father, Sir Gillies, without dispute
Sir Charles Payne, de facto 4th Baronet (died 1841) - succeeded his father, Sir John, without dispute
Sir Coventry Payne, 5th Baronet (died 1849)
Sir Coventry Payne, 6th Baronet (died 1874)
Sir Philip Monoux Payne, 7th Baronet (1858–1935)

See also
Frankland-Payne-Gallwey baronets
Ralph Payne, 1st Baron Lavington

References

Extinct baronetcies in the Baronetage of Great Britain
West Indies merchants